Live at CBGB or Live at CBGB's may refer to:

 Live at CBGB (Agnostic Front album), a 1989 album by Agnostic Front
 Live at CBGB (Kill Your Idols album), a 2005 album by Kill Your Idols
 Live at CBGB's (VAST album), a 2006 album by VAST
 Live at CBGB's 1982, a 2006 album by Bad Brains
 Live at CBGB's 1983, a 1997 album by Flipper
 Live at CBGB's 1984, a 2005 album by D.R.I.
 Live CBGB's NYC 1998, a 2003 album by Alec Empire and Merzbow
 Live At CBGB's: The Home Of Underground Rock, a 1976 album by various artists
 Live at CBGB's (Sham 69 album), 1991
 KoRn Live at CBGBs'', a bonus DVD by Korn